This article presents a list of the historical events and publications of Australian literature during 1889.

Books 
 Ada Cambridge – A Woman's Friendship
 Fergus Hume
 The Girl from Malta
 Lady Jezebel
 Hume Nisbet – Doctor Bernard St. Vincent : A Sensational Romance of Sydney
 Rosa Praed – The Romance of a Station
 Catherine Helen Spence – A Week in the Future

Short stories 
 Francis Adams
 "Lily Davenant, Will Jeckyll's Version"
 "Miss Jackson"
 Edward Dyson – "The Washerwoman of Jacker's Flat"
 Henry Lawson – "The Story of Malachi"
 A. B. Paterson – "Hughey's Dog : A Station Sketch"

Poetry 

 Edward Dyson – "The Worked-Out Mine"
 Henry Lawson
 "The Ballad of the Drover"
 "The Ghost"
 "The Roaring Days"
 "The Teams"
 Henry Parkes – Fragmentary Thoughts
 A. B. Paterson
 "Clancy of the Overflow"
 "How McGinness Went Missing"
 "An Idyll of Dandaloo"

Births 

A list, ordered by date of birth (and, if the date is either unspecified or repeated, ordered alphabetically by surname) of births in 1889 of Australian literary figures, authors of written works or literature-related individuals follows, including year of death.

 23 February – Vera Dwyer, novelist (died 1967)
20 September – Ion Idriess, novelist (died 1979)

Deaths 

A list, ordered by date of death (and, if the date is either unspecified or repeated, ordered alphabetically by surname) of deaths in 1889 of Australian literary figures, authors of written works or literature-related individuals follows, including year of birth.

See also 
 1889 in poetry
 List of years in literature
 List of years in Australian literature
1889 in literature
 1888 in Australian literature
1889 in Australia
1890 in Australian literature

References

Literature
Australian literature by year
19th-century Australian literature
1889 in literature